Reynders or Reijnders is a Dutch patronymic surname common in the Limburg area. The form Reinders is more common in the Eastern Netherlands and the flanking regions of Germany. The Dutch given name Reinder is a variation on Reinier (from Saint Rainier) or sometimes Reinhard.  Notable people with the surname include:

Reynders
Agnes Kay Eppers Reynders, Bolivian road cyclist
Bennie Reynders (born 1962), South African sprint canoeist
Didier Reynders (born 1958), Belgian politician
Henri Reynders (1903–1981), Belgian Roman Catholic priest and humanitarian
Herman Reynders (born 1958), Belgian basketball player and politician
John Reynders (1888–1953), British musician and composer
Joseph Reynders (born 1929), Belgian swimmer
Kamiel Reynders (born 1931), Belgian swimmer
Martin Reynders (born 1972), Dutch footballer and manager
Yvonne Reynders (born 1937), Belgian cyclist
Reijnders
 (born 1954), Dutch architect
Izaak Reijnders (1879–1966), Dutch Army general
Peter Reijnders (1900–1974), Dutch photographer, film director and inventor
Tijjani Reijnders (born 1998), Dutch footballer
Reinders
Elmar Reinders (born 1992), Dutch racing cyclist
 (1737–1815), Dutch immunologist
Joel Reinders (born 1987), Canadian football offensive tackle
Kate Reinders (born 1980), American musical theatre actress
Trevor Reinders (born 1963), Zimbabwean cricketer
Uwe Reinders (born 1955), German football player and manager

Dutch-language surnames
Patronymic surnames

nl:Reijnders